Reed–Muller may refer to:
 Reed–Muller code
 Reed–Muller expansion